The Christmas Caroler Challenge is an American reality television competition that premiered on The CW on December 15, 2019. The series is traditionally scheduled in a double-run of two hour-long episodes, all airing in December annually as a part of the CW's holiday programming lineup. On October 19, 2020, it was announced that the series would be returning for a second season, which premiered on December 11, 2020.

Premise
The series features 10-12 Christmas carol groups, each with their own stylized brand of performance, facing off to win a grand prize of; a trophy, 1,000 toys to be donated to Marine Toys for tots in the name of the winning caroling group and an opportunity to appear and perform at the Annual Hollywood Christmas Parade.

Episodes

Season 1 (2019)

Season 2 (2020)

References

External links

2010s American reality television series
2019 American television series debuts
2020s American reality television series
2020 American television series endings
Christmas television specials
English-language television shows
Television series by Associated Television International
The CW original programming